Darine (born 1983) is a Lebanese-Swedish singer-songwriter. With two albums in account, her debut single was "Aiwa" on her album Ma Rulez. In 2006, she released her second studio album My Compliments.

Biography
Darine was born in Tripoli, Lebanon in 1983 to a Lebanese father and Romanian mother.

Career
Darine's debut single, "Aiwa", was released in summer 2004, and it was produced by EMI Music Arabia & PRO Music. After that, she released her debut album Ma Rulez, which included two versions of the song "Aiwa" along with eighteen new tracks. The album included "Ja Leily" (pronounced "Ya Leily"). This was Darine's second single.

The album was re-issued for the European region which had a different cover with more English songs. Darine released a second album in 2006 which was titled My Compliments, which is again under EMI. The album had 17 tracks in both English and Arabic languages. The first single of this album was called "Ma Fi Ella Enta" and the album generally received good reviews.

However, Darine was going through management changes and she changed her management label and she did not continue to promote her second album. Since then Darine has been absent from the music industry and she did few tracks independently and she has been aiming to do a comeback. Currently, she is not signed to any label.

Darine released an extended play in summer 2022 with never-heard-before demos along with two new tracks.

Albums 

 Ma Rulez (2004) 
 My Compliments (2006)

References

External links
 Darine at Spotify
 Darine at Instagram

1984 births
Living people
People from Tripoli, Lebanon
Swedish people of Romanian descent
Swedish people of Lebanese descent
21st-century Swedish singers
21st-century Swedish women singers